Shawky Gharieb Bayoumi (born 26 February 1959) is a former football midfielder who played for Ghazl El-Mehalla and the Egypt national football team. He managed the Egypt side that won the bronze medal at the 2001 FIFA World Youth Championship in Argentina.

As a player, Ghareeb made several appearances for the Egypt national football team. He participated in four editions of the African Cup of Nations, and was part of the title-winning squad in 1986. He also played for Egypt at the 1984 Summer Olympics in Los Angeles.

International goals 

Scores and results list Egypt's goal tally first.

Managerial statistics

Honours

Player

Egypt
Africa Cup of Nations Champions 1986

Manager

Egypt
FIFA U-20 World Cup Third Place: 2001
Africa U-23 Cup of Nations Champions: 2019

Individual
2019 Africa U-23 Cup of Nations Best Coach of the Tournament

References

External links

1959 births
Living people
Egyptian footballers
Egypt international footballers
Mediterranean Games bronze medalists for Egypt
Competitors at the 1983 Mediterranean Games
Footballers at the 1984 Summer Olympics
Olympic footballers of Egypt
1980 African Cup of Nations players
1984 African Cup of Nations players
1986 African Cup of Nations players
1988 African Cup of Nations players
Smouha SC managers
Ismaily SC managers
Egypt national football team managers
Africa Cup of Nations-winning players
Association football midfielders
People from El Mahalla El Kubra
Mediterranean Games medalists in football
Egyptian football managers
20th-century Egyptian people
21st-century Egyptian people